A. silvestrii may refer to:

 Acromyrmex silvestrii, Emery, 1905, a New World ant species in the genus Acromyrmex
 Acropyga silvestrii, Emery, 1915, an ant species in the genus Acropyga
 Aenictus silvestrii, Wheeler, 1929, an ant species in the genus Aenictus
 Amblyopone silvestrii, the Dracula ant, an ant species in the genus Amblyopone
 Amphisbaena silvestrii, a worm lizard species found in Brazil
 Apopyllus silvestrii, a spider species found in Peru, Bolivia, Brazil, Argentina and Chile 
 Argulus silvestrii, a carp louse, a parasitic crustacean species

See also
 Silvestrii (disambiguation)